Ronna Marlene Glickman (née Levine) and Beverly Ginsberg (née Schiff, formerly Ginsberg, Kahn, Frisch) are the 50-something (born 1962) characters created and embodied by actors and comedians Jessica Chaffin and Jamie Denbo. They hosted a podcast on the Earwolf network from 2011 until 2017 wherein they interviewed a celebrity guest, interacted with one another, and dispensed advice to listeners. Chaffin and Denbo developed their characters in 2006 when they were asked to host an all-Jewish 'Kosher Christmas Show' at the Upright Citizens Brigade Theatre.

Live performances from the pair are frequently advertised as "seminars" in which their characters discuss the fictional book they co-authored, "You'll Do a Little Better Next Time: A Guide to Marriage and Re-marriage for Jewish Singles."  After introducing the book, either Chaffin or Denbo will often add the clarification, "It says Jewish in the name, but it's for everyone!"

Podcast 
Episodes of their eponymous podcast, Ronna and Beverly, were released every two weeks by Earwolf. Guests included people working in comedy, as well as actors, authors, and filmmakers.  The podcast premiered on May 25, 2011.  In episode 161 on June 15, 2017 (not long after they started teasing the possibility of releasing weekly episodes), Ronna and Beverly suddenly announced they were taking off "for the summer."  Since then, no new episodes have been released and the actresses have not appeared together in character.  Jessica Chaffin has kept Ronna alive by appearing in character as a guest on other podcasts and by maintaining an Instagram account.  On the April 16, 2018, episode of the Why Mommy Drinks podcast, guest Jamie Denbo confirmed that she "used to" have a podcast called Ronna and Beverly, ostensibly indicating the conclusion of the series.

On March 11, 2019, Denbo announced she will be launching a spinoff podcast titled Beverly In LA on Stitcher Premium.

Spinoff Podcasts

Beverly in LA 
Denbo formerly hosted a solo spin-off podcast on the Stitcher network titled Beverly in LA chronicling the life of Beverly Ginsberg as she pursued wellness and explored various means of living a healthier, more mindful life in Los Angeles.

On June 15, 2020, Denbo posted a photo of her iconic Beverly wig and doubled pair of glasses with the caption "Goodbye and shalom with all the love in my (her) haaaaaaht" to her personal Instagram. On an episode of her podcast "The Human Condition" Denbo spoke, out of character, candidly about her uncertainty of the ethics of portraying Beverly, a racist and conspiracy theorist, for comedy, in light of the Black Lives Matter movement and the political climate in the United States. She announced the retirement of the Beverly character and the subsequent cancellation of her podcast.

Ask Ronna
In November 2019 Chaffin and co-host Bryan Safi premiered a new podcast called Ask Ronna, in which Chaffin continues to appear as Ronna Glickman. Safi and Chaffin's show focuses on requests for advice and questions from listeners, and often feature a celebrity guest.

Television 
In 2009, a television pilot, based on the two women was produced by Showtime, with Jenji Kohan co-writing and co-producing and with Paul Feig directing. The pilot was not picked up.

In 2012, British network Sky Atlantic aired one season of a chat show, starring Ronna and Beverly. The six-episode run was also directed by Paul Feig.

Live performances 
Ronna and Beverly performed monthly in Los Angeles at the UCB-LA Theatre. They also brought their show to the Edinburgh Fringe Festival in 2010. The characters made particular fuss over their international lifestyle, and London was a frequent topic of note on their podcast and in print. In 2010, Denbo and Chaffin performed as Ronna and Beverly for a brief run at London's Soho Theatre.

Podcast episodes

References

External links 

Comedy and humor podcasts
Audio podcasts
Earwolf
English-language television shows
2011 podcast debuts
2017 podcast endings
Jewish podcasts